Ascalenia sirjanella is a moth in the family Cosmopterigidae. It was described by Kasy in 1975. It is found in Iran.

References

Natural History Museum Lepidoptera generic names catalog

Moths described in 1975
Ascalenia
Moths of Asia